Bert Thomas was a cartoonist.

Bert Thomas may also refer to:

Bert Thomas (Kon'nichiwa Anne: Before Green Gables), fictional character
Bert Thomas, performer at Theatre of NOTE

See also
Herbert Thomas (disambiguation)
Albert Thomas (disambiguation)
Robert Thomas (disambiguation)
Hubert Thomas (disambiguation)
Bertram Thomas, explorer
B. W. R. Thomas, Sri Lankan cricketer